Jasenovac is a village in the municipality of Bosanski Petrovac, Bosnia and Herzegovina, located east of the town of Bosanski Petrovac, on the M5 road (part of E761) to Ključ, between the villages Bravski Vaganac and Bravsko.

Demographics 
In 1991, the village had a total population of 430 people; 424 Serbs, 4 Yugoslavs, and 2 Others/Unknown.

According to the 2013 census, its population was 157.

References

Populated places in Bosanski Petrovac
Serb communities in the Federation of Bosnia and Herzegovina